Janine Tischer (born 19 May 1984 in Meiningen) is a German bobsledder who has competed since 2002. She won three medals in the two-woman event at the FIBT World Championships with two silvers (2007, 2008) and a bronze (2009).

Tischer finished seventh in the two-woman event at the 2010 Winter Olympics in Vancouver.

References
 
  
 Bobsleigh two-woman world championship medalists since 2000

1984 births
Bobsledders at the 2010 Winter Olympics
German female bobsledders
Living people
Olympic bobsledders of Germany
People from Meiningen
Sportspeople from Thuringia
21st-century German women